The Isleys Live is a live album released by The Isley Brothers on March 24, 1973 on T-Neck Records as a double album with the catalog number TNS 3010-2. Recorded at the Bitter End in New York City, the band are introduced as T-Neck recording artists before they take the stage. Two decades later, Rhino Records re-issued the album including three live dates from the brothers' 1969 show at Yankee Stadium. This album is the only T-Neck recording not reissued by Sony Music Entertainment; instead, it was reissued by Rhino Records.

The album was remastered and expanded for inclusion in the 2015 released CD box set The RCA Victor & T-Neck Album Masters, 1959-1983.

Track listing

Personnel
O'Kelly Isley -  backing vocals
Ronald Isley - lead and backing vocals
Rudolph Isley - backing vocals
Ernie Isley - electric guitar
Marvin Isley - bass
Chris Jasper - piano
Neil Bathe - drums
Karl Potter - congas
Technical
Michael DeLugg - engineer

References

The Isley Brothers albums
1972 live albums
Rhino Records live albums
Albums recorded at the Bitter End